This is a list of rivers in the U.S. state of Utah in the United States, sorted by watershed.

Colorado River
The Colorado River is a major river in the Western United States, emptying into the Gulf of California. Rivers are listed upstream by the point they empty into the Colorado.
 Meadow Valley Wash (located entirely in Nevada, but its watershed has several extremely small portions in Utah)
 Virgin River
 Beaver Dam Wash
 Santa Clara River
 Ash Creek
 Fort Pearce Wash
 East Fork Virgin River
 North Fork Virgin River
 Kanab Creek
 Paria River
 Buckskin Gulch
 San Juan River
 Chinle Creek
 Montezuma Creek
 McElmo Creek
 Escalante River
 Coyote Gulch
 Dirty Devil River
 Fremont River
 Sulphur Creek
 Sand Creek
 Muddy Creek
 Green River
 San Rafael River
 Price River
 White River
 Range Creek
 Willow Creek
 White River
 Duchesne River
 Uinta River
 Whiterocks River
 Lake Fork River
 Yellowstone River (Utah)
 Yellowstone Creek
 Swift Creek (Utah)
 Strawberry River
 Ashley Creek
 Brush Creek
 Jones Hole Creek (Diamond Gulch)
 Crouse Creek
 Cart Creek
 Carter Creek
 Sheep Creek 
 Henrys Fork
 Blacks Fork
 Muddy Creek
 Kane Springs Creek
 Dolores River
 La Sal Creek

Great Salt Lake
The Great Salt Lake is the largest lake in the Great Basin. Rivers are listed in a clockwise direction.
 Bear River
 Malad River
 Little Bear River
 Logan River
 Cub River
 Bear Lake
 Weber River
 Mill Creek
 Ogden River
 Dalton Creek
 Jordan River
 City Creek
 Red Butte
 Emigration Creek
 Parley's Creek
 Mill Creek
 Big Cottonwood Creek
 Little Cottonwood Creek
 Bingham Creek
 Willow Creek
 Midas Creek
 Dry Creek
 Utah Lake
 Dry Creek
 American Fork
 Provo River
 Hobble Creek
 Dry Creek
 Spanish Fork
 Peteetneet Creek (no longer reaches Utah Lake)
 Current Creek
 West Creek
 Kimball Creek

Other Great Basin
A number of other drainage systems are located in the Great Basin.
 Curlew Valley
 Escalante Desert
 Great Salt Lake Desert
 Miry Wash
 Grouse Creek
 Thousand Springs Creek
 Hamlin Valley
 Pilot Creek Valley
 Pine Valley
 Rush Valley
 Harker Creek
 Sevier Lake
 Sevier River
 Beaver River
 San Pitch River
 Mammoth Creek
 Clear Creek
 East Fork Sevier River
 Skull Valley
 Snake Valley
 Tooele Valley
 Tule Valley
 Wah Wah Valley

Snake River
The Snake River, which flows into the Pacific Ocean via the Columbia River, does not enter Utah, but some of its tributaries drain northwestern Utah.
 Goose Creek
 Raft River

See also
 List of rivers in the Great Basin
 List of rivers in the United States
 List of canyons and gorges in Utah

External links

Utah rivers
 
Rivers